J. J. Barrie (born Barry Authors, July 7, 1933) is a Canadian songwriter and singer. He is best known for his 1976 UK chart-topper, "No Charge".

Biography
A former Blue Mink and Ocean manager, and ex-comedian, Barrie turned to songwriting and in early 1976 co-wrote “Where's The Reason" with Terry Britten for Glen Campbell. They sent a demo to Campbell's producer, but he suggested Barrie record it. This he did, but it was unsuccessful. Undaunted, Barrie recorded a cover version of the country ballad "No Charge", penned by Harlan Howard, on Barrie's own label, Power Exchange. The track featured an uncredited vocal from Vicki Brown (wife of Joe Brown, and one-time member of both The Vernons Girls and The Breakaways), and was produced by Bill Amesbury. The single reached Number 1 in the UK Singles Chart in June 1976, where it remained for one week. The track spent eleven weeks in the chart.

The session musician, Clem Cattini, played the drums of "No Charge", one of his forty five UK number one hit appearances on record. Billy Connolly's 1976 Top 40 hit, "No Chance (No Charge)", was a spoof version of Barrie's chart-topper.

Barrie re-released "Where's The Reason" as a follow-up but it again failed to chart. Power Exchange had one other UK Top 20 hit single – "Who's Gonna Love Me" by The Imperials (without Little Anthony) in December 1977 - after which the label ceased trading. Barrie returned to Canada and tried to resume music publishing, artist management and agency representation - his former jobs during the 1960s. In 1980, he returned to the UK to record his own track, "You Can't Win 'Em All" b/w "It's Only A Game" – with the then Nottingham Forest F.C. manager Brian Clough – which was released on MCA late in the year. However, without any further chart presence in the UK, he remains labelled as a one-hit wonder.  He released two albums for RCA, My Son and Dreamin, and another single, also called "My Son".

Barrie's erstwhile recording partner, Vicki Brown, died of cancer on June 16, 1991.

In 1999, an album, titled No Charge was issued on Start Records.

Barrie released a UK compilation album in 2011 through the Demon Music Group, called No Charge. In the US, a new download only album, Especially For You. 

He is currently working in the film industry as a writer and producer, and is still living in Canada. He is releasing three new albums through Angel Air Records (UK) and the first, No Charge, will be released worldwide on October 6, 2014, both in digital and CD formats.

He is not to be confused with J. J. Barrie (author and novelist of To Steal a Lady and To Kill a Priest); nor J.M. Barrie, the Scottish born author of Peter Pan.

Discography

Albums

Singles

See also
One-hit wonders in the United Kingdom

References

External links
BBC.co.uk Top of the Pops 2 video clip

1933 births
Living people
Canadian country singer-songwriters
Canadian male singer-songwriters
Musicians from Oshawa